The 1989–90 Arizona Wildcats men's basketball team represented the University of Arizona. The head coach was Lute Olson. The team played its home games in the McKale Center in Tucson, Arizona, and was a member of the Pacific-10 Conference. In the Pac-10 Basketball Tournament, Arizona beat UCLA by a score of 94–78 to claim its third consecutive Pac-10 title.

Roster

Schedule and results

|-
!colspan=9 style=| Regular season

|-
!colspan=9 style=| Pac-10 Tournament

|-
!colspan=9 style=| NCAA Tournament

|}

Awards and honors
 Jud Buechler, Pacific-10 Conference men's basketball tournament Most Valuable Player

Team players drafted into the NBA

References

Arizona
Arizona
Arizona Wildcats men's basketball seasons
Pac-12 Conference men's basketball tournament championship seasons
1989 in sports in Arizona
Arizona Wildcats